SLES is an initialism for:

 Sodium lauryl ether sulfate, a chemical
 SUSE Linux Enterprise Server,

See also
 OpenSL ES, Open Sound Library for Embedded Systems